Devonshire Street was a short-lived railway station in the parish of Mile End Old Town, in the East End of London. It was opened on 20 June 1839 as a temporary London terminus of the Eastern Counties Railway (ECR) from  prior to the construction of Shoreditch station which became the permanent terminus.

On opening the weekday service consisted of seven weekday and six Sunday trains. An additional train serving Romford Market ran on Wednesdays.

After Shoreditch opened, Devonshire Street continued in use as a through passenger station for a year before it was closed in 1840.

In 1884 a new station called  opened close to the site of the closed Devonshire Street station.

The street after which the station was named was later incorporated into the northern part of Bancroft Road, running east–west next to the tracks. The station was situated on an embankment adjacent to the Devonshire Street skew bridge.

See also
List of closed railway stations in London
Great Eastern Railway

References

Disused railway stations in the London Borough of Tower Hamlets
Former Great Eastern Railway stations
Railway stations in Great Britain opened in 1839
Railway stations in Great Britain closed in 1840